Events in chess during the year 2015:

2015 tournaments 

This is a list of significant 2015 chess tournaments:

Key dates 
 26 May: Fabiano Caruana and Hikaru Nakamura clinch the top two positions in the FIDE Grand Prix 2014–15, securing their spots in the 2016 Candidates Tournament
 5 October: Sergey Karjakin and Peter Svidler place first and second, respectively, in the Chess World Cup 2015, securing two spots in the 2016 Candidates Tournament
 12 October: Magnus Carlsen defends the World Chess Rapid Championship title
 14 October: Alexander Grischuck wins the World Chess Blitz Championship title

FIDE world rankings 
The FIDE World Rankings in December was

References 

 
21st century in chess
Chess by year